To "go to the dogs" is to decline or deteriorate.

Gone to the Dogs may also refer to:

Books
 Gone to the Dogs (Emily Carmichael novel), a 2003 teen novel
 Going to the Dogs: The Story of a Moralist, English title of the 1932 novel Fabian. Die Geschichte eines Moralisten by Erich Kästner
 Gone to the Dogs, a 1984 children's book by John Rowe Townsend
 Going to the Dogs, a 1987 novel by Julian Barnes writing as Dan Kavanagh
 Gone to the Dogs, a 1992 Dog Lover's Mysteries novel by Susan Conant
 Gone to the Dogs, a 1994 book by Robin Page about the BBC TV series One Man and His Dog
 Gone to the Dogs: Life With My Canine Companions, a 2004 autobiographical work by Robert F. Jones completed by Louise Jones

Film, theatre and TV

Film
 Gone to the Dogs (1939 film), a musical comedy film starring George Wallace
 Gone to the Dogs (2006 film), a comedy film directed by Philip Barnard
 Gone to the Dogs, a 1952 film starring Ouyang Sha-fei
 Gone to the Dogs, a 2008 film written and directed by Liz Tuccillo

Television
 Gone to the Dogs (TV series), a 1991 comedy-drama miniseries that aired in the UK
 "Gone to the Dogs", a 1970 episode of the cartoon series Harlem Globetrotters (TV series)
 "Gone to the Dogs", a segment of a 1979 episode of the cartoon series Casper and the Angels
 "Going to the Dogs", a 1982 episode of the American animated TV series Meatballs & Spaghetti
 "Going to the Dogs", a 1983 segment of an episode of the American comedy/drama TV series The Love Boat
 "Going to the Dogs", a 1995 episode of the MTV reality TV series Road Rules: USA – The First Adventure
 "Gone to the Dogs", a 1997 episode of the American children's series Kidsongs
 "Gone to the Dogs", a 2003 episode of the Australian outback drama McLeod's Daughters (season 3)
 "Gone to the Dogs", a segment of a 2006 episode of the American cartoon series Four Eyes!
 "Gone to the Dogs", a segment of a 2006 episode of the French cartoon series Watch My Chops (in the U.S.: Corneil & Bernie)
 "Gone to the Dogs", a 2007 episode of the Canadian animated TV series Carl²
 "Gone to the Dogs", a 2008 episode of the American reality TV show Ace of Cakes
 "Gone to the Dogs", a 2008 episode of the British reality TV show Sky Cops
 "Gone to the Dogs", a 2010 episode of the reality show Wa$ted! (American TV series)
 "Going to the Dogs", a 2011 episode of the American reality TV series Million Dollar Listing Los Angeles
 "This Show Has Gone to the Dogs!", a 2013 episode of the American reality TV show The Good Buy Girls
 "Going to the Dogs", a 2014 episode of the animated online web series Barbie: Life in the Dreamhouse
 "Going to the Dogs", a 2014 episode of the American reality TV show Mystery Diners
 "Gone to the Dogs", a 2018 episode of the Australian comedy series The Bureau of Magical Things
 "Gone to the Dogs", a two-part 2018 episode of the American animated web series DC Super Hero Girls
 "Gone to the Dogs", a segment of a 2018 episode of the Canadian CGI-animated series Snowsnaps (French: Les Mini-Tuques)

Theatre
 Going to the dogs, a 1986 "play" of 46 minutes with six well-trained Alsatian dogs directed by Wim T. Schippers

Music

Songs
 "Cat That's Gone to the Dogs", a track on the 1986 album Swamp of Love by the Canadian band Deja Voodoo 
 "Gone to the Dogs", a track on the 1991 album Play (Squeeze album)
 "Gone to the Dogs", a track on the 1994 album Nordic Quartet by English saxophonist John Surman
 "Gone to the Dogs", a track on the 1999 album Can't Get There from Here by Great White
 "Christmas is Going to the Dogs", a song from the 2000 soundtrack by Eels of How the Grinch Stole Christmas (2000 film)
 "Gone to the Dogs", a track on the 2006 album KT Tunstall's Acoustic Extravaganza
 "Gone with the Dogs", a track in the 2006 boxed set Sonic's Rendezvous Band (album)

English-language idioms
Metaphors referring to dogs